Lotz is a German surname. Notable people with the surname include:

Anne Graham Lotz (born 1948), American evangelist
Amanda D. Lotz, American educator and scholar
Caity Lotz (born 1986), American actress
Christian Lotz (born 1970), German-American philosopher
Denton Lotz (1939–2019), American pastor
Deon Lotz (born 1964), South African actor
Dick Lotz (born 1942), American golfer
Hans Lotz (born 1947), Australian hammer thrower
Ingrid Lotz (born 1934), German discus thrower
Irmgard Flügge-Lotz (1903–1974), German mathematician and engineer
Jack Lotz (1933–2020), American wrestling referee
Joe Lotz (1891–1971), American baseball player
John Lotz (1935–2001), American basketball player and coach
John N. Lotz, American general
Károly Lotz (1833–1904), German-Hungarian painter
Kurt Lotz (1912–2005), German business executive
Marc Lotz (born 1973), Dutch cyclist
Martin Lotz (born 1938), German hammer thrower
Matilda Lotz (1858–1923), American painter
Michael J. Lotz, American business executive
René Lotz (born 1938), Dutch cyclist
Sarah Lotz, British novelist and screenwriter
Ute Lotz-Heumann (born 1966), German-American historian
Wolfgang Lotz (1921–1993), Israeli spy

See also
Lotz Cisterns, an archaeological site in Negev Mountains, Israel
Brissonneau and Lotz, French locomotive manufacturer

References

German-language surnames
Surnames from given names